Kraftprobe is a 1982 West German drama film directed by Heidi Genée. It was entered into the 32nd Berlin International Film Festival.

Cast
 Kirstin Genee as Paulina
 Hannelore Hoger as Lisa, Paulina's mother
 Kai Taschner as Blues
 Erika Wackernagel as Mrs. Windinger

References

External links

1982 films
1982 drama films
German drama films
West German films
1980s German-language films
Films directed by Heidi Genée
Films based on German novels
1980s German films